The conquered lorikeet (Vini vidivici) is a species of parrot that became extinct 700–1300 years ago. It lived in islands of Polynesia. David Steadman and Marie Zarriello wrote its species description in 1987.

It was discovered in the oldest archaeological layer of 1000 AD and not recorded after 1200 AD.

Description
It was a large species; the only larger species in Vini was V. sinotoi.

Distribution
Specimens have been found on Hiva Oa, Nuku Hiva, Ua Huka, and Tahuata (Marquesas Islands); Mangaia (Cook Islands); and Huahine (Society Islands).

Etymology
The binomial name is wordplay alluding to "veni, vidi, vici." The authors wrote in the original description:

The generic name in fact does not come from Latin; René Lesson chose Vini as the name for the genus since  is the Tahitian word for a local bird.

References

Vini (bird)
Holocene extinctions
†
†
Extinct birds of Oceania
Late Quaternary prehistoric birds
Birds described in 1987